Pires do Rio Futebol Clube, better known simply as Pires do Rio, is a Brazilian football club in the city of Pires do Rio, in the state of Goiás.

History
Founded on September 7, 1935 in the city of Pires do Rio in the state of Goiás, the club is affiliated to Federação Goiana de Futebol 
and Currently, the club disputes Campeonato Goiano (Third Division). In 1992, FGF held an intermediate competition called Campeonato Goiano (Intermediate Division). Caldas ended up being champion and won the right to dispute the first division of Goiano.

Titles
 Campeonato Goiano (Second Division) (1996)

References 

Association football clubs established in 1982
Football clubs in Goiás